Blasiaceae is a family of liverworts with only two species: Blasia pusilla (a circumboreal species) and Cavicularia densa (found only in Japan).  The family has traditionally been classified among the Metzgeriales, but molecular cladistics suggests a placement at the base of the Marchantiopsida.

References

External links 
 Liverwort Tree of Life
 Simplified phylogeny of the liverworts

Liverwort families
Blasiales